= Valorie Thomas =

American Africana studies scholar

Valorie D. Thomas is an American Africana studies scholar, consultant, and screenwriter. She was the Phebe Estelle Spalding Professor of English and Africana Studies at Pomona College in Claremont, California.

== Early life ==
Thomas studied at the University of California, Berkeley, where she received her bachelor's, master's, and doctoral degrees. She also holds a master's degree in screenwriting from the University of California, Los Angeles.

== Career ==
Thomas began teaching at Pomona College in 1998. She was the Phebe Estelle Spalding Professor of English and Africana Studies, an endowed chair.

== Recognition ==
In 2013, Thomas won Pomona's Wig Distinguished Professor Award, the college's highest faculty honor, in recognition of her teaching.

== Personal life ==
Thomas is an equestrian and practices yoga.
